Press freedom predator is an anti-award distributed every few years by Reporters Without Borders. It is attributed to heads of state or groups who are deemed to have a negative effect on press freedom.

Recipients often vehemently deny that they deserve their place on the list. In 2020, Reporters Without Borders also released a list of 20 press freedom's digital predators.

2021 
In July 2021, the list of press freedom predators published by Reporters Without Borders includes:

2016 
In October 2016, the list of press freedom predators published by Reporters Without Borders includes:

2013 
In May 2013, the list of press freedom predators published by Reporters Without Borders includes:

Africa

Americas

Asia

Europe

2009-2011
The list of press freedom predators published by Reporters Without Borders from 2009 to 2011 includes:

2001
In November 2001, the list of press freedom predators published by Reporters Without Borders includes:

Digital press freedom predators
In March 2020, as part of the World Day Against Cyber-Censorship, the Reporters Without Borders published a list of digital press freedom predators. The list includes:

Harassment

State censorship

Disinformation

Spying Surveillance

References 

Ironic and humorous awards
Freedom of the press